This is a list of the National Register of Historic Places listings in Fort Bend County, Texas.

This is intended to be a complete list of properties and districts listed on the National Register of Historic Places in Fort Bend County, Texas. There are one district and seven individual properties listed on the National Register in the county. Three of the individually listed properties are Recorded Texas Historic Landmarks including one that is also a State Antiquities Landmark.

Current listings

The locations of National Register properties and districts may be seen in a mapping service provided.

|}

See also

National Register of Historic Places listings in Texas
Recorded Texas Historic Landmarks in Fort Bend County

References

External links

Fort Bend County, Texas
Fort Bend County
Buildings and structures in Fort Bend County, Texas